Long Lake is a natural lake in South Dakota, in the United States.

Long Lake was so named on account of the lake's relatively long outline.

See also
List of lakes in South Dakota

References

Lakes of South Dakota
Bodies of water of McPherson County, South Dakota